Wired is the second solo studio album by Hugh Cornwell, released on 21 June 1993 on the Transmission label. It follows the collaboration album with Robert Williams, Nosferatu (1979), and first proper solo outing, Wolf (1988). Wired was produced by Gary Langan (Art of Noise), with the exception of "Ain't It Strange", which was produced by Cornwell. It was recorded in 1992 at Metropolis Studios in London and Soundlab Studios in Wiltshire. The album's progress was affected by contractual disputes. Cornwell was initially signed to Phoenix Records, but the label started to fall into difficulties and Cornwell cited them for breach of contract. A new deal was struck with NTV (Transmission) to finish the album. Phoenix then maintained that NTV had no right to release the album with arguments over the matter continuing until February 1994. As a result, the album was initially only released in Europe. Two singles were released from the album, "The Story of He & She" in 1993, and "My Kind of Loving" in 1994.

The album was re-released by Griffin Records in 1995 in both CD and cassette formats.

The album was released in the United States on 27 April 1999 on the Velvel Record label, under the title First Bus To Babylon with different artwork and different track listing. The album includes a cover version of Jimi Hendrix's "Stone Free", which according to Cornwell was originally considered for inclusion on the initial release of Wired.

Track listing

The American edition retitled First Bus to Babylon dropped the track "Make It With You" and includes "Stone Free" and "My Kind of Loving" (12" version).

Personnel
Credits adapted from the album liner notes.

Musicians
 Hugh Cornwell – guitar, vocals
 Chris Goulstone – guitar
 Ted Mason – guitar
 Tomoyasu Hotei – guitar
 Alex Gifford – bass guitar 
 Phil Andrews – keyboards
 George De Angelis – Hammond organ
 Robert Williams – drums, percussion
 Steve Ferrera – additional drum programming
 Wesley Magoogan – brass 
 Joel Squires – harmonica

Technical
 Gary Langan – producer (except "Ain't It Strange"), photography
 Hugh Cornwell – producer ("Ain't It Strange")
 James Cadsky – engineer
 Jamie Cullum – assistant engineer
 John Pasche – artwork, design
 David Mach – artwork (hanger head)
 David Scheinmann – photography

Release history

References

Further reading
 Cornwell, Hugh, A Multitude of Sins. London. Harper Collins Publishers, 2004. 

1993 albums
Hugh Cornwell albums